Challenger was an extreme clipper ship built in East Boston in 1853. She sailed in the San Francisco trade, and later in the guano trade in Peru.

Voyages
Between 1854 and 1863, Challenger made two voyages from Boston to San Francisco, in 112 and 134 days, and five voyages from New York to San Francisco, in 115 to 133 days.
In 1861, she "collided with the ship Roswell Sprague in a gale in the roadstead of Bremerhaven".

Guano trade and shipwreck

In 1863, Challenger was sold to the Peruvian Government, and renamed Camille Cavour. She was "used in the transport of Chinese coolies to the guano islands".

In 1875, she was "damaged in a gale on voyage from Port Discovery to Peru and was abandoned off the coast of Mexico. The wreck drifted ashore at Manzanillo."

References

California clippers
Individual sailing vessels
Age of Sail merchant ships of the United States
Ships built in Boston
Guano trade
Coolie trade
Shipwrecks of the Mexican Pacific coast
Maritime incidents in 1861
1853 ships